
Lake Paliastomi (also transliterated as Paleaostom) is a small lake near the city of Poti, Georgia, connected to the Black Sea by a narrow channel. Its surface area is 17.3 km2 and the mean depth is 2.6 m. Some ancient pieces of Colchis have been found near and in the lake by archaeologists. It is also an important fishery site.

The lake is included within the boundaries of the Kolkheti National Park.

References

External links
Underwater archaeology in Lake Paliastomi
Global Nature Fund website 
Improving management of Lake Paliastomi through integration

Paliastomi
Archaeological sites in Georgia (country)
Poti
Geography of Samegrelo-Zemo Svaneti